Parliamentary elections were held in Austria on 17 December 1995 to elect the 20th National Council, the lower house of Austria's bicameral parliament. The snap election was called after the collapse of the grand coalition between the Social Democratic Party of Austria (SPÖ) and Austrian People's Party (ÖVP) due to a dispute regarding the national budget. The SPÖ made small gains primarily at the expense of minor parties, while the ÖVP remained stable. The grand coalition was subsequently renegotiated.

Contesting parties 
The table below lists parties represented in the 19th National Council.

Results

Results by state

References

Elections in Austria
Austria
Legislative
Austria